Little Deer Lake may refer to:

 Little Deer Lake (Honnedaga Lake, New York)
 Little Deer Lake (Ohio, New York)